Abram is a commune in Bihor County, Crișana, Romania with a population of 3,354 people. It is composed of eight villages: Abram, Cohani (Berettyókohány), Dijir (Dizsér), Iteu (Lüki), Iteu Nou (Újüki), Margine (Széltalló), Satu Barbă (Újbártfalva), and Suiug (Szunyogd).

References

Abram
Localities in Crișana